John Valiant Daley (1 February 1906 – 14 June 1986), was an English first-class cricketer and a greyhound trainer.

Personal life
He was born in Beccles; died in Margate.

Cricket career
He played for Surrey County Cricket Club from 1936 until 1938.

Greyhound racing
He trained a greyhound called Good Worker that won the 1948 Laurels, Silver Salver and Wimbledon Two-Year Old Produce Stakes. The following year the same greyhound won the Champion Stakes.

He was attached as a trainer to Ramsgate Stadium at the time but in 1949 he relinquished his licence to become a cricket coach.

References

1906 births
1986 deaths
English cricketers
Surrey cricketers
British greyhound racing trainers
Suffolk cricketers
Norfolk cricketers